Illegitimate is a 2016 Romanian drama film directed by Adrian Sitaru. The film premiered at 2016 Berlin Film Festival, where it received C.I.C.A.E Award Also, the film won the Golden Arena for the Best Film (Pula, Croatia), Namur Award for the Best Screenplay and Best Actor (Adrian Titieni), and Prix Sauvage - Special Mention-Best Actress (Alina Grigore) at L’Europe autour de l’Europe, Paris. The film shows the story of two siblings, brother - Romeo Anghelescu (Robi Urs) and sister - Sasha Anghelescu (Alina Grigore), who have an incestuous love.

Cast
 Adrian Titieni as Victor Anghelescu
 Bogdan Albulescu as Cosma Anghelescu
 Alina Grigore as Sasha Anghelescu
 Robi Urs as Romeo Anghelescu
 Cristina Olteanu as Gilda Anghelescu
 Miruna Dumitrescu Butache as Julie
 Liviu Vizitiu as Bogdan Dumitrescu
 Mihaela Perianu as Ema Nedela
 Adrian Iacov as Alex Barbu
 Anastasia Passerotti as Sânziana Casian
 Andrei Iordache as Daniel
 Gabriela Ursu as Doctor
 Liviu Florescu as Tudor
 Andreea Lascu 		
 Alexandra Dumitrescu 		
 Anamaria Antoci

See also
 List of Romanian films of 2016

References

External links
 

2016 films
Romanian drama films
2010s Romanian-language films
2016 drama films